The U23 Women's Sprint at the European Track Championships was first competed in 1997 (according to cyclingarchives.com).

Medalists
This list is incomplete. You can help wikipedia by expanding it. Information could be found on the existing European Track Championships pages (see column: Championships) and here:

References

under-23 sprint
Women's sprint (track cycling)